"Miks" is the second single by Finnish rapper Sini Sabotage from her debut album 22 m². Released on 1 November 2013, the song peaked at number 14 on the Finnish Singles Chart.

Chart performance

References

Finnish songs
2013 singles
Sini Sabotage songs
2013 songs